An arthrotomy is the creation of an opening in a joint that may be used in drainage.

See also 
 List of surgeries by type

References

Orthopedic surgical procedures